Lois Andison is an installation artist whose mixed materials installations explore intersections of technology, geography and the body. She currently teaches sculpture and digital media at the University of Waterloo.

Biography 
Andison was born in Smith Falls, Ontario and now resides in Toronto, Ontario. Previous to her artistic career, Andison worked as a professional illustrator and graphic designer. She received her Bachelor of Fine Arts from York University in 1990. Since graduation she has worked as a professional artist, with her first solo exhibition hosted by Gallery Seventy-Six in Toronto, Ontario. Her works have also been exhibited outside the formal gallery system. In 2019 her work tree of life was exhibited at BMO Project Room in Toronto.

Collections
Andison's work is included in the collection of the National Gallery of Canada.

References

External links
 tree of life website

Living people
Canadian installation artists
Women installation artists
York University alumni
Academic staff of the University of Waterloo
21st-century Canadian women artists
Year of birth missing (living people)